The Yemenite ambassador in Brussels is the official representative of the Government in Aden to the Government of the Belgium and the European Commission.

List of ambassadors

References

 
Belgium
Yemen